Henry Bayntun or Baynton may refer to:

 Henry Bayntun (died 1672) (1621–1672), English MP for Chippenham
 Henry Bayntun (died 1691) (1664–1691), English MP for Chippenham and Calne
 Henry William Bayntun (1766–1840), Royal Navy officer
 Henry Baynton (1892–1951), British actor
 Henry Baynton I (fl. 1572–1593),  English politician
 Henry Baynton (died 1616) (1571–1616), English politician